Neylon v Dickens [1977] 2 NZLR 35 is an often cited case regarding  whether a change to a contract is a waiver or variation.

Background
The Neylons purchased the Dickens farm, with the sale agreement requiring both parties to get the consent of the High Court within 30 days. Just before the expiry of the 30 days, Neylon's solicitor realized that as his client lived in far away Haast, they would be unable to get the consent in time. Dicken's solicitor agreed to file his clients consent on the basis that the purchasers consent would arrive later, which it did, but after the expiry date.

The vendors claimed that as the expiry date was not met, the sale agreement came to an end. However, the purchasers later obtained an order from the Court of Appeal for specific performance. The Dickens appealed.

Held
The court held that the vendor's solicitor's agreement to file for the consent without first receiving the purchasers consent, was a valid waiver, and so the sale agreement was still a valid agreement.

References

Judicial Committee of the Privy Council cases on appeal from New Zealand
1977 in case law
1977 in New Zealand law
New Zealand contract case law